Charles Bémont (16 November 1848 – 21 September 1939), French scholar, was born in Paris.

Life
In 1884 he graduated with two theses, one on Simon de Montfort translated as Simon de Montfort: Earl of Leicester, 1208-1265 (1930), without the thesis' appendices of historical documents,  and La Condamnation de Jean Sansterre (Revue historique, 1886). His Les Chartes des libertés anglaises (1892) has an introduction upon the history of Magna Carta, etc., and his history of medieval Europe, written in collaboration with Gabriel Monod (1896), was translated into English, as Medieval Europe from 395 to 1270.

He was also responsible for the continuation of the Gascon Rolls, the publication of which had been begun by Francisque Michel in 1885 (supplement to vol. 5, 1896; vol. ii., for the years 1273–1290, 1500; vol. iii., for the years 1290–1307, 1906). He received the honorary degree of Litt. Doc. at Oxford in 1909. He was made a corresponding member of the British Academy in 1914.

A street in Croissy-sur-Seine commemorates him.

References

Attribution:

1848 births
1939 deaths
20th-century French historians
Writers from Paris
French male non-fiction writers
Corresponding Fellows of the Medieval Academy of America
Corresponding Fellows of the British Academy
19th-century French historians